Grümpel is a river of Bavaria, Germany. At its confluence with the Kremnitz near Wilhelmsthal, the Kronach is formed.

See also
List of rivers of Bavaria

Rivers of Bavaria
Rivers of Germany